Long Sukang (also known as Sukang) is a Lun Bawang settlement in the Lawas division of Sarawak, Malaysia.

The village has over 60 households, with a total population of about 500. Facilities include a clinic, primary school, a Sidang Injil Borneo (SIB) Church and solar hybrid power. Long Sukang Airport is nearby.

The four villages, Long Lidung, Long Remirang, Puneng Brayong and Long Tuyo are close to Long Sukang, and they all co-operate in social and welfare activities.

The surrounding settlements include:

References

Villages in Sarawak